was a province of Japan, which today comprises the southeastern part of Hyōgo Prefecture and the northern part of Osaka Prefecture.

Osaka and Osaka Castle were the main center of the province. Most of Settsu's area comprises the modern day cities of Osaka and Kōbe.

History
During the Sengoku period, the Miyoshi clan ruled Settsu and its neighbors, Izumi and Kawachi, until they were conquered by Oda Nobunaga. The provinces were ruled subsequently by Toyotomi Hideyoshi. The regents of Hideyoshi's son soon quarreled, and when Ishida Mitsunari lost the Battle of Sekigahara, the area was given to relatives of Tokugawa Ieyasu.  It was from then on divided into several domains, including the Asada Domain.

Sumiyoshi taisha was designated as the chief Shinto shrine (ichinomiya) for the province.  

During the Sengoku period Settsu became the main exporting centre of matchlock firearms to the rest of Japan.

Historical districts
 Osaka Prefecture
 Higashinari District (東成郡) - absorbed Sumiyoshi District on April 1, 1896; dissolved on April 1, 1925
 Nishinari District (西成郡) - dissolved on April 1, 1925
 Nose District (能勢郡) - merged with Teshima District to become Toyono District (豊能郡) on April 1, 1896
 Shimakami District (島上郡) - merged with Shimashimo District to become Mishima District (三島郡) on April 1, 1896
 Shimashimo District (島下郡) - merged with Shimakami District to become Mishima District on April 1, 1896
 Sumiyoshi District (住吉郡) - merged into Higashinari District on April 1, 1896 
 Teshima District (豊島郡) - merged with Nose District to become Toyono District on April 1, 1896
 Hyōgo Prefecture
 Arima District (有馬郡) - dissolved on July 1, 1958
 Kawabe District (川辺郡)
 Muko District (武庫郡) - absorbed Ubara and Yatabe Districts on April 1, 1896; dissolved on April 1, 1954
 Ubara District (菟原郡) - merged into Muko District (along with Yatabe District) on April 1, 1896
 Yatabe District (八部郡) - merged into Muko District (along with Ubara District District) on April 1, 1896

Notes

References
 Nussbaum, Louis-Frédéric and Käthe Roth. (2005).  Japan encyclopedia. Cambridge: Harvard University Press. ;  OCLC 58053128

External links 

  Murdoch's map of provinces, 1903

 
Former provinces of Japan
History of Hyōgo Prefecture
History of Osaka Prefecture